Gury Vasilievich Kolosov (Гурий Васильевич Колосов, 25 August 1867 – 7 November 1936) was a Russian and  Soviet mathematician and engineer. He is best known for his contributions to the theory of elasticity. In 1907 Kolosov derived the solution for stresses around an elliptical hole in a solid material governed by the mathematical theory of elasticity. He showed that the concentration of stress could become far greater, as the radius of curvature at an end of the hole becomes small compared with the overall length of the hole.

Kolosov was born in Ust, Novgorod guberniya.  He then studied at University of St Petersburg where he continued to after graduation.  Eventually, he defended his thesis there under the supervision of V.A. Steklov. He worked at University of Tartu (from 1902 to 1913), but later returned to St Petersburg where he worked at both the University of St Petersburg and the Electrotechnical Institute. He was an invited speaker at the International Congress of Mathematicians in 1908 at Rome and in 1928 at Bologna.

Kolosov was elected a corresponding member of the Russian Academy of Sciences in 1931. He wrote the 1935 monograph "The use of a complex variable in the theory of elasticity" (in Russian).

He was buried in Smolensky Cemetery.

References

External links

Picture – from the Russian Academy of Sciences web site.

1867 births
1936 deaths
19th-century mathematicians from the Russian Empire
20th-century Russian mathematicians
Soviet mathematicians
Soviet engineers
20th-century Russian engineers
Saint Petersburg State University alumni
Academic staff of Saint Petersburg State University
Corresponding Members of the USSR Academy of Sciences
Academic staff of the University of Tartu